In October 2006, the United States Geological Survey (USGS) adopted a nationwide alert system for characterizing the level of unrest and eruptive activity at volcanoes. The system is now used by the Alaska Volcano Observatory, the California Volcano Observatory (California and Nevada), the Cascades Volcano Observatory (Washington, Oregon and Idaho), the Hawaiian Volcano Observatory and the Yellowstone Volcano Observatory (Montana, Wyoming, Colorado, Utah, New Mexico and Arizona).

Under this system, the USGS ranks the level of activity at a U.S. volcano using the terms "normal", for typical volcanic activity in a non-eruptive phase; "advisory", for elevated unrest; "watch", for escalating unrest or an eruption underway that poses limited hazards; and, "warning", if a highly hazardous eruption is underway or imminent. These levels reflect conditions at a volcano and the expected or ongoing hazardous volcanic phenomena. When an alert level is assigned by an observatory, accompanying text will give a fuller explanation of the observed phenomena and clarify hazard implications to affected groups.

Summary of Volcanic Activity Alert Notification System

Aviation color codes

Earlier volcano warning schemes for the United States 
Prior to October 2006, three parallel Volcano warning schemes were used by the United States Geological Survey and the volcano observatories for different volcano ranges in the United States. They each have a base level for dormant-quiescent states and three grades of alert.

Color Code Conditions, Long Valley Caldera and Mono-Inyo Craters Region, California
Developed in 1997 to replace a previous 5-level system devised in 1991.

Level of Concern Color Codes for volcanoes in Alaska

The Alaska Volcano Observatory (AVO) used the following color-coded system to rate volcanic activity.  It was originally established during the 1989-90 eruption of Redoubt Volcano.

All five classifications are spelled as proper nouns, i.e., Level of Concern Color Code Orange not Level of concern color code Orange or any other variation.  On its website the AVO spells the alert color in all capitals, but this is not otherwise necessary outside their system.

Warning system for Cascade Range volcanoes in Washington and Oregon
Introduced following the May 18, 1980, eruption of Mount St. Helens.

References
USGS Volcanic Activity Alert-Notification System page
AVO information release about new warning scheme

Volcanology
Warning systems
Color codes